Elmalı is a  village in Uzunköprü district of Edirne Province, Turkey,  It is situated in the Eastern Thrace plains at . The population of the village was 830 as of 2011. The old name of this village is Ermeniköy. It was a Bulgarian village during the Ottoman Empire era. But after the Second Balkan War the Bulgarian population was forced to leave the settlement.

References

Populated places in Uzunköprü District
Villages in Uzunköprü District